Balša or Balsha was a provincial lord of the Zeta in ca. 1362. He is the eponymous founder of the Balšić noble family.

Life
He was a nobleman and military commander during the rule of Emperor Dušan the Mighty (r. 1331–1355) but managed to expand his power after the death of Dušan (20 December 1355) and gained control of the island of Mljet. He began by taking lands previously held by Lord Žarko, in Lower Zeta (south of Lake Skadar, and is then recognized as a "provincial lord" in charters of Emperor Uroš the Weak (r. 1355–1371). In 1362 his sons defeated and killed Head of Upper Zeta Đuraš Ilijić and expanded further into Upper Zeta. He is believed to have died by this time.

He had three sons, Đurađ, Stracimir and Balša II, two of whom ruled the Principality of Zeta: Đurađ I and Balša II.

References

Sources

 

D. Živković, Istorija Crnogorskog Naroda, 1989, Cetinje

 
People of the Serbian Empire
Medieval Montenegro
League of Lezhë
Principality of Zeta